Morganstown Castle Mound, also known as Morganstown Motte, is a medieval motte in the community of Morganstown in Cardiff, Wales, which is a scheduled monument.

History
Motte-and-bailey castles date back to the medieval period, from 1066 to 1540 AD. Recently a broken piece of French polychrome pottery ware was found on the site. There is no record of the motte as to its exact age, although as with other mottes in the north of Cardiff, such as Treoda Castle Mound and Twmpath Castle, it is believed that it was established between the late 11th century and early 12th century.

Present day
The tower on the motte would have been constructed out of either timber or stone. The site is now overgrown with trees and shrubs.

Cadw has described the monument as being of "of national importance for its potential to enhance our knowledge of medieval defensive practices. The monument is well-preserved and an important relic of the medieval landscape. It retains significant archaeological potential, with a strong probability of the presence of both structural evidence and intact associated deposits. The scheduled area comprises the remains described and areas around them within which related evidence may be expected to survive."

See also
List of castles in Wales
Castles in Great Britain and Ireland
List of scheduled monuments in Cardiff
List of motte-and-bailey castles

References

External links

 
 Images of the Morganstown Castle Mound from the RCAHMW 

Castles in Cardiff
Scheduled monuments in Cardiff
Motte-and-bailey castles